N'Guelbély (also: Nguel Bely, N'Guelbeyli, N'Guel Beyli) is a village and rural commune in Niger.

Geography
N'Guelbély lies in the Sahel. The neighboring communes are Tesker to the north, N'Gourti to the northeast, Foulatari to the east, south and Maïné-Soroa Goudoumaria are in the southwest. The commune is divided into the administrative village of N'Guelbély, five camps and two water sources. The seat of the community is the administrative village of N'Guelbély.

History

The rural community of N'Guelbély emerged as an administrative unit in 2002 as part of a nationwide administrative reform,  dividing the territory of the canton of Maïné-Soroa, creating the communities of Foulatari, Maïné-Soroa and N'Guelbély.

In the 2001 census, N'Guelbély had 1,000 inhabitants. For the year 2010, 1,367 inhabitants were reported.

Economy and Infrastructure
The community is located in the transition zone to the south of the Agropastoralismus zone of pure pasture economy in the north.

References

Communes of Niger